The Singspiel Stakes is  a Thoroughbred horse race run annually at Woodbine Racetrack in Toronto, Ontario, Canada. The Stakes is run during the latter part of June on the same card as the Queen's Plate, as of 2008 it carries Grade III status. The race is open to horses aged three and older and is contested  over a distance of  miles on turf. It currently offers a purse of $125,000.

Inaugurated in 2005, the race was named for Irish-bred Singspiel, who won the prestigious Canadian International Stakes at Woodbine Racetrack in 1996 and who was a son of the Canadian Horse Racing Hall of Fame filly, Glorious Song.

Records
Speed record:
 2:27.15 - Jambalaya (2006)

Most wins:
 3 - Musketier (2009, 2011, 2012)
 3 - Aldous Snow (2014, 2015, 2017)

Most wins by a jockey:
 3 - Jono Jones (2006, 2007, 2009)

Most wins by a trainer:
 7 - Roger L. Attfield (2007, 2009, 2010, 2011, 2012, 2013, 2016, 2022)
Most wins by an owner:

 4 - Sam-Son Farm (2014, 2015, 2017, 2020)

Winners of the Singspiel Stakes

See also
 List of Canadian flat horse races

References

The Singspiel Stakes at Pedigree Query

Graded stakes races in Canada
Turf races in Canada
Open middle distance horse races
Recurring events established in 2005
Woodbine Racetrack